There are two species of skink named Bibron's skink:

 Chioninia coctei, a reptile known to have inhabited islets in the Cape Verde islands
 Eutropis bibronii, a lizard endemic to India and Sri Lanka